Banavachku (also Romanized as Banāvachkū; also known as Banāvachkāh and Banāvajkūh) is a village in Dowlatabad Rural District, in the Central District of Ravansar County, Kermanshah Province, Iran. At the 2006 census, its population was 138, in 24 families.

References 

Populated places in Ravansar County